The United States women's national soccer team (USWNT) represents the United States in international women's soccer. The team is the most successful in international women's soccer, winning four Women's World Cup titles (1991, 1999, 2015, and 2019), four Olympic gold medals (1996, 2004, 2008, and 2012), and nine CONCACAF Gold Cups. It medaled in every World Cup and Olympic tournament in women's soccer from 1991 to 2015, before being knocked out in the quarterfinal of the 2016 Summer Olympics. The team is governed by United States Soccer Federation and competes in CONCACAF (the Confederation of North, Central American, and Caribbean Association Football).

After mostly being ranked No. 2 from 2003 to 2008 in the FIFA Women's World Rankings, the team was ranked No. 1 continuously from March 2008 to November 2014, the longest consecutive top ranking of any team. Since FIFA rankings were established in 2003, it has been ranked No. 1 for a total of 13 years; the only other team to be ranked No. 1, Germany, has been there for a total of 4 years. The USWNT has never been ranked lower than second. 

The team was selected as the U.S. Olympic Committee's Team of the Year in 1997 and 1999, and Sports Illustrated chose the entire team as 1999 Sportswomen of the Year for its usual Sportsman of the Year honor. On April 5, 2017, USWNT players and U.S. Soccer reached a deal on a new collective bargaining agreement that would, among other things, lead to a pay increase. In February 2022, numerous current and former members of the USWNT, including Megan Rapinoe and Alex Morgan, settled a lawsuit with the U.S. Soccer Federation for $24 million and a requirement that male and female soccer players be paid equally in the future.

History

Origins in the 1980s
The passing of Title IX in 1972, which outlawed gender-based discrimination for federally-funded education programs, spurred the creation of college soccer teams across the United States at a time when women's soccer was rising in popularity internationally. The U.S. Soccer Federation tasked coach Mike Ryan to select a roster of college players to participate in the 1985 Mundialito tournament in Italy, its first foray into women's international soccer. The team played its first match on August 18, 1985, losing 1–0 to Italy, and finished the tournament in fourth place after failing to win its remaining matches against Denmark and England.

University of North Carolina coach Anson Dorrance was hired as the team's first full-time head coach in 1986 with the goal of fielding a competitive women's team at the next Mundialito and at future tournaments. In their first Mundialito under Dorrance, the United States defeated China, Brazil, and Japan before finishing as runners-up to Italy. Dorrance gave national team appearances to teenage players, including future stars Mia Hamm, Julie Foudy, and Kristine Lilly, instead of the college players preferred by the federation, and called into camp the first African-American player on the team, Kim Crabbe. The United States played in the 1988 FIFA Women's Invitation Tournament in China, a FIFA-sanctioned competition to test the feasibility of a regular women's championship, and lost in the quarterfinals to eventual champions Norway.

1990s
Following the 1988 tournament, FIFA announced plans for a new women's tournament, named the 1st FIFA World Championship for Women's Football for the M&M's Cup until it was retroactively given the "World Cup" name. The United States qualified for the tournament by winning the inaugural CONCACAF Women's Championship, hosted by Haiti in April 1991, outscoring their opponents 49–0 for the sole CONCACAF berth in the tournament. The team played several exhibition matches abroad against European opponents to prepare for the world championship, while its players quit their regular jobs to train full-time with meager compensation. Dorrance utilized a 4–3–3 formation that was spearheaded by the "Triple-Edged Sword" of forward Michelle Akers-Stahl and wingers Carin Jennings and April Heinrichs.

At the Women's World Cup, the United States won all three of its group stage matches and outscored its opponents 11–2. In the opening match against Sweden, the U.S. took a 3–0 lead early in the second half, but conceded two goals to end the match with a narrower 3–2 victory. The U.S. proceeded to win 5–0 in its second match against Brazil and 3–0 in its third match against Japan in the following days, clinching first place in the group and a quarterfinal berth. The United States proceeded with a 7–0 victory in the quarterfinals over Chinese Taipei, fueled by a five-goal performance by Akers-Stahl in the first fifty minutes of the match.

In the semifinals against Germany, Carin Jennings scored a hat-trick in the first half as the team clinched a place in the final with a 5–2 victory. The team's lopsided victories in the earlier rounds had brought attention from American media outlets, but the final match was not televised live in the U.S. The United States won the inaugural Women's World Cup title by defeating Norway 2–1 in the final, played in front of 65,000 spectators at Tianhe Stadium in Guangzhou, as Akers-Stahl scored twice to create and restore a lead for the Americans. Akers-Stahl finished as the top goalscorer at the tournament, with ten goals, and Carin Jennings was awarded the Golden Ball as the tournament's best player.

Despite their Women's World Cup victory, the U.S. team remained in relative obscurity and received a small welcome from several U.S. Soccer Federation officials upon arrival at John F. Kennedy International Airport in New York City. The team were given fewer resources and little attention from the federation as they focused on improving the men's national team in preparation for the 1994 men's World Cup that would be hosted in the United States. The women's team was placed on hiatus after the tournament, only playing twice in 1992, but returned the following year to play in several tournaments hosted in Cyprus, Canada, and the United States, including a second CONCACAF Championship title. The program was still supported better than those of the former Soviet Union, where football was considered a "men's game". 

The United States played in several friendly tournaments to prepare for the 1995 FIFA Women's World Cup and its qualification campaign. The first was the inaugural staging of the Algarve Cup in Portugal, which saw the team win its two group stage matches but lose 1–0 to Norway in the final. It was followed by a victory in the Chiquita Cup, an exhibition tournament hosted in August on the U.S. East Coast against Germany, China, and Norway. Dorrance resigned from his position as head coach in early August and was replaced by his assistant, Tony DiCicco, a former professional goalkeeper who played in the American Soccer League. DiCicco led the United States to a berth in the Women's World Cup by winning the 1994 CONCACAF Championship, where the team scored 36 goals and conceded only one.

In February 1995, the U.S. women's program opened a permanent training and treatment facility in Sanford, Florida, and began a series of warm-up friendlies that were paid for by American company Nike. The team topped their group in the Women's World Cup, despite a 3–3 tie with China in the opening match and losing goalkeeper Briana Scurry to a red card in their second match. The United States proceeded to beat Japan 4–0 in the quarterfinals, but lost 1–0 to eventual champions Norway in the semifinals. The team finished in third place, winning 2–0 in its consolation match against China.

The team won the gold medal in the inaugural Olympic women's soccer tournament in the 1996 Summer Olympics, defeating China 2–1 in the final before a crowd of 76,481 fans. An influential victory came in the 1999 World Cup, when the team defeated China 5–4 in a penalty shoot-out following a 0–0 draw after extended time. Julie Foudy, Kristine Lilly, and the rest of the 1999 team started a revolution towards women's team sports in America. With this win they emerged onto the world stage and brought significant media attention to women's soccer and athletics. On July 10, 1999, over 90,000 people (the largest ever for a women's sporting event and one of the largest attendances in the world for a tournament game final) filled the Rose Bowl to watch the United States play China in the Final. After a back and forth game, the score was tied 0–0 at full-time, and remained so after extra time, leading to a penalty kick shootout. With Briana Scurry's save of China's third kick, the score was 4–4 with only Brandi Chastain left to shoot. She scored and won the game for the United States. Chastain dropped to her knees and whipped off her shirt, celebrating in her sports bra, which later made the cover of Sports Illustrated and the front pages of newspapers around the country and world. This win influenced many girls to want to play on a soccer team. In the 2000 Summer Olympics, the USWNT were close to defending their gold medal but were controversially defeated by Norway in the final with a golden goal in extra time, which involved an alleged handball in the lead-up.

2000s
In the 2003 FIFA Women's World Cup, the U.S. defeated Norway 1–0 in the quarterfinals but lost 0–3 to Germany in the semifinals. The team then defeated Canada 3–1 to claim third place. Abby Wambach was the team's top scorer with three goals, while Joy Fawcett and Shannon Boxx made the tournament's all-star team. In the 2004 Olympics, the last major international tournament for Hamm and Foudy, the U.S. earned the gold medal, winning 2–1 over Brazil in the final on an extra time goal by Wambach.

At the 2007 FIFA Women's World Cup, the U.S. defeated England 3–0 in the quarterfinals but then suffered its most lopsided loss in team history when it lost to Brazil 0–4 in the semifinals. The U.S. recovered to defeat Norway to take third place. Abby Wambach was the team's leading scorer with 6 goals, and Kristine Lilly was the only American named to the tournament's all-star team.

The team won another gold medal in the 2008 Olympics, but interest in the Women's National Team had diminished since their performance in the 1999 World Cup. However, the second women's professional league was created in March 2009, Women's Professional Soccer.

2010s
In the quarterfinal of the 2011 Women's World Cup in Germany, the U.S. defeated Brazil 5–3 on penalty kicks. Abby Wambach's goal in the 122nd minute to tie the game 2–2 has been voted the greatest goal in U.S. soccer history and the greatest goal in Women's World Cup history. The U.S. then beat France 3–1 in the semifinal, but lost to Japan 3–1 on penalty kicks in the Final after drawing 1–1 in regulation and 2–2 in overtime. Hope Solo was named the tournament's best goalkeeper and Abby Wambach won the silver ball as the tournament's second-best player.

In the 2012 Summer Olympics, the U.S. won the gold medal for the fourth time in five Olympics by defeating Japan 2–1 in front of 80,203 fans at Wembley Stadium, a record for a women's soccer game at the Olympics. The United States advanced to face Japan for the gold medal by winning the semifinal against Canada, a 4–3 victory at the end of extra time. The 2012 London Olympics marked the first time the USWNT won every game en route to the gold medal and set an Olympic women's team record of 16 goals scored.

The National Women's Soccer League started in 2013, and provided competitive games as well as opportunities to players on the fringes of the squad. The U.S. had a 43-game unbeaten streak that spanned two yearsthe streak began with a 4–0 win over Sweden in the 2012 Algarve Cup, and came to an end after a 1–0 loss against Sweden in the 2014 Algarve Cup.

The U.S. defeated Japan 5–2 in the final of the 2015 World Cup, becoming the first team in history to win three Women's World Cup titles. In the 16th minute, Carli Lloyd achieved the fastest hat-trick from kick-off in World Cup history, and Abby Wambach was greeted with a standing ovation for her last World Cup match. Following their 2015 World Cup win, the team was honored with a ticker tape parade in New York City, the first for a women's sports team, and honored by President Barack Obama at the White House. On December 16, 2015, however, a 0–1 loss to China in Wambach's last game meant the team's first home loss since 2004, ending their 104-game home unbeaten streak.

In the 2016 Summer Olympics, the U.S. drew against Sweden in the quarterfinal; in the following penalty kick phase, Sweden won the game 4–3. The loss marked the first time that the USWNT did not advance to the gold medal game of the Olympics, and the first time that the USWNT failed to advance to the semifinal round of a major tournament.

After the defeat in the 2016 Olympics, the USWNT underwent a year of experimentation which saw them losing three home games. If not for a comeback win against Brazil, the USWNT was on the brink of losing four home games in one year, a low never before seen by the USWNT. 2017 saw the USWNT play 12 games against teams ranked in the top-15 in the world.

Throughout 2018, the U.S. would pick up two major tournament wins, winning both the SheBelieves Cup and the Tournament of Nations. The team would enter qualifying for the 2019 FIFA Women's World Cup on a 21-game unbeaten streak and dominated the competition, winning all five of its games and the tournament whilst qualifying for the World Cup as well as scoring 18 goals and conceding none. On November 8, 2018, the U.S. earned their 500th victory in team history after a 1–0 victory over Portugal. The start of 2019 saw the U.S. lose an away game to France, 3–1, marking the end of a 28-game unbeaten streak and their first loss since a 1–0 defeat to Australia in July 2017.

The USWNT started off their 2019 FIFA Women's World Cup campaign with a 13–0 victory against Thailand, setting a new Women's World Cup goal record. Alex Morgan equaled Michelle Akers' record of scoring five goals in a single World Cup match, while four of her teammates scored their first World Cup goals in their debut at the tournament. The U.S. would win its next match against Chile 3–0 before concluding the group stage with a win of 2–0 over Sweden. The team emerged as the winners of Group F and would go on to face Spain in the Round of 16, whom they would defeat 2–1 thanks to a pair of Megan Rapinoe penalties. The team would achieve identical results in their next two games. With 2–1 victories over France and then England seeing them advance to a record third straight World Cup final, they played against the Netherlands for the title. They beat the Netherlands 2–0 in the final on July 7, 2019, becoming the first team in history to win four Women's World Cup titles.

On July 30, 2019, Jill Ellis announced that she would step down as head coach following the conclusion of the team's post-World Cup victory tour on October 6, 2019.  

Vlatko Andonovski was hired as head coach of the USWNT in October 2019, replacing Ellis.

2020s
The USWNT began the new decade by winning both the 2020 CONCACAF Women's Olympic Qualifying tournament (which qualified the team for the 2020 Summer Olympics) and the 2020 SheBelieves Cup titles.

In early March 2020, due to the COVID-19 pandemic, the USSF canceled previously scheduled USWNT friendlies against Australia and Brazil. Later that same month, it was announced by the International Olympic Committee (IOC) and the Tokyo Metropolitan Government that the 2020 Summer Olympics were to be postponed until July 2021. The USWNT played their first game in eight months on November 27, 2020, when they took on the Netherlands in a friendly match. Rose Lavelle and Kristie Mewis scored, the team winning the game 2–0.

On July 21, 2021, the USWNT lost 3–0 against Sweden in the opening round of group stage at the 2020 Summer Olympics, thus ending a 44-match unbeaten streak. The U.S. would rebound by winning their 2nd match against New Zealand, before concluding the group stage by tying Australia 0–0. The team placed 2nd in the group stage and qualified for the knockout stage. They first faced World Cup runners-up Netherlands who they tied 2–2 before winning the match in a penalty shootout. The USWNT advanced to the semifinals where they faced Canada. However, the team would lose to Canada 1–0 by a penalty scored by Jessie Fleming. They would later face Australia again in the bronze medal match in a rematch of their final group stage game. The U.S. won 4–3, making it the first time the team won the bronze medal.

In July 2022, the team competed in the CONCACAF W Championship. The USWNT won its group, outscoring opponents 9–0 in the group stage, and then won the semifinal 3–0 against Costa Rica and the final 1–0 against Canada. It was their ninth CONCACAF championship title. By reaching the semifinal, the team qualified for the 2023 World Cup, and by winning the final, it qualified for both the 2024 Summer Olympics in France and the 2024 CONCACAF W Gold Cup.

In November 2022, the USWNT’s 71-game home unbeaten streak ended, after a 1–2 defeat in an exhibition game against Germany.

Team image

Media coverage
U.S. television coverage for the five Women's World Cups from 1995 to 2011 was provided by ESPN/ABC and Univision, while coverage rights for the three Women's World Cups from 2015 to 2023 were awarded to Fox Sports and Telemundo. In December 2021, a deal was signed to broadcast TV coverage of other USWNT games between TNT and TBS  and streaming on HBO Max through the end of 2030. The USWNT games in the 2014 CONCACAF Women's Championship and the 2015 Algarve Cup were broadcast by Fox Sports. NBC will broadcast the Olympic tournament through 2032.

The 1999 World Cup final set the original record for largest U.S. television audience for a women's soccer match, averaging 18 million viewers. It was the most viewed English-language U.S. broadcast of any soccer match until the 2015 FIFA Women's World Cup final between the United States and Japan.

The 2015 Women's World Cup Final between the United States and Japan was the most watched soccer match—men's or women's—in American broadcast history. It averaged 23 million viewers and higher ratings than the NBA finals and the Stanley Cup finals. The final was also the most watched US-Spanish language broadcast of a FIFA Women's World Cup match in history.

Overall, there were over 750 million viewers for the 2015 FIFA Women's World Cup, making it the most watched Women's World Cup in history. The FIFA Women's World Cup is now the second-most watched FIFA tournament, with only the men's FIFA World Cup attracting more viewership.

In popular culture 
A narrative nonfiction book covering the entire history of the team from 1985 to 2019 called The National Team: The Inside Story of the Women Who Changed Soccer was named one of Vanity Fairs best books of 2019 and made NPR's 2019 year-end books list.  A book about the team's 1999 Women's World Cup campaign, Girls of Summer: The U.S. Women's Soccer Team and How It Changed the World was released in 2001 and in 2020 Netflix announced a film based on the book. 

In 2005, HBO released a documentary called Dare to Dream: The Story of the U.S. Women's Soccer Team. In 2013, a documentary about the 1999 World Cup-winning team called The 99ers was produced by former player Julie Foudy and ESPN Films.

Attendance
The 1999 World Cup final, in which the United States defeated China, set a world attendance record for a women's sporting event of 90,185 in a sellout at the Rose Bowl in Southern California (until it was broken on March 30, 2022, with 91,553 people at the Camp Nou in Barcelona, Spain in the second-leg of a UEFA Women's Champions League match. The record for Olympic women's soccer attendance was set by the 2012 Olympic final between the USWNT and Japan, with 80,023 spectators at Wembley Stadium.

 Legal issues 
 Pay discrimination 
Since 2016, the players of the U.S. team had waged an escalating legal fight with the United States Soccer Federation (USSF) over gender discrimination. Central to their demands was equal pay. The players pointed to their lower paychecks as compared to their male counterparts despite their higher record of success in recent years.

In April 2016, five U.S. team players filed a wage-discrimination action against the USSF with the Equal Employment Opportunity Commission. The group consisted of Hope Solo, Carli Lloyd, Alex Morgan, Megan Rapinoe, and Becky Sauerbrunn.

One year later, in April 2017, the U.S. team agreed to a new collective bargaining agreement (CBA) with the USSF. The agreement stated that the U.S. team players would have an increased base pay and improved match bonuses. These changes could increase their previous pay from $200,000 to $300,000. However, the CBA did not guarantee equal pay compared to the men's team. The CBA's five-year term through 2021 ensured that the next negotiation would not become an issue for the team for the 2019 World Cup and the 2020 Olympics. On top of this CBA, the USSF had agreed to pay the players for two years' worth of unequal per-diem payments.

On March 8, 2019, 28 members of the U.S. team filed a gender discrimination lawsuit against the USSF. The lawsuit, filed in the U.S. District Court in Los Angeles, accused the USSF of "institutional gender discrimination." The lawsuit claimed that the discrimination affected not only the amount the players were paid but also their playing, training, and travel conditions. In May 2020, several key parts of the case were dismissed, with federal judge R. Gary Klausner noting that the team had agreed to take higher base compensation and other benefits in their most recent CBA instead of the bonuses received by the men's team.

On March 8, 2021, the second anniversary of the team's pay discrimination lawsuit, Congresswomen Doris Matsui and Rosa DeLauro introduced the Give Our Athletes Level Salaries (GOALS) Act to ensure the team members "are paid fair and equitable wages compared to the U.S. Men's team." The GOALS Act threatened to cut federal funding for the 2026 World Cup if the USSF did not comply.

On February 22, 2022, the USSF agreed to settle the lawsuit for $24 million, contingent upon the U.S. team agreeing to a new CBA. $22 million would go to the players named in the case, and $2 million would contribute toward players' post-playing career and other women's soccer charitable efforts. On May 18, 2022, the U.S. team agreed to a new CBA that would run through 2028 and would equalize compensation, bonuses, and other work conditions between the women's and the men's national teams friendlies, therefore finalizing the legal settlement.

Artificial turf
Along with their lawsuit for pay-equity, the US Women's Soccer players have fought FIFA on policies regarding artificial turf. This battle to eliminate the use of turf in major women's games heightened around the 2015 FIFA Women's World Cup, hosted by Canada; during this tournament, the US Women played 8 of their 10 games on artificial turf. Prior to the 2015 World Cup, Abby Wambach headed a discrimination lawsuit with other global soccer stars including Marta of Brazil and Homare Sawa of Japan. Due to the tournament's quick approach, the suit was dropped as players were denied an expedited hearing.

Staff
 Coaching staff 

 Technical staff 

 Head coach history 

Sources

Players

Current squad

The following 23 players were named to the squad for the 2023 SheBelieves Cup.
 
Caps and goals are current as of February 22, 2023, after match against .

Recent call-ups

The following players were also named to a squad in the last 12 months.Notes: : Preliminary squad

Recent schedule and results

The following is a list of match results in the last 12 months, as well as any future matches that have been scheduled.

2022

2023

 USWNT Schedule
 USWNT Results
 USA: Fixtures and Results – FIFA.com

All-time results

SourcesAll Time Results from FIFA.com

Individual records
Player records

. Active players are shown in Bold.

The women's national team boasts the first six players in the history of the game to have earned 200 caps. These players have since been joined in the 200-cap club by several players from other national teams, as well as by seven more Americans: Kate Markgraf, Abby Wambach, Heather O'Reilly, Carli Lloyd, Hope Solo, Becky Sauerbrunn, and Alex Morgan. Kristine Lilly, Carli Lloyd, and Christie Pearce are the only players to earn more than 300 caps.

In March 2004, Mia Hamm and Michelle Akers were the only two women and the only two Americans named to the FIFA 100, a list of the 125 greatest living soccer players chosen by Pelé as part of FIFA's centenary observances.

The following players were chosen as the USWNT All-Time Best XI in December 2013 by the United States Soccer Federation:
 Goalkeeper: Briana Scurry
 Defenders: Brandi Chastain, Carla Overbeck, Christie Rampone, Joy Fawcett
 Midfielders: Kristine Lilly, Michelle Akers, Julie Foudy
 Forwards: Mia Hamm, Abby Wambach, Alex MorganSource(s)

Source(s)

Source(s)

Source(s)

Note: The goal record for most scored in a match by a member of the USWNT is five, which has been accomplished by the nine players above.

Head coach records
Most appearances:  Jill Ellis: 132
Most wins:  Jill Ellis: 106

Team records
Biggest victory
14–0 vs. Dominican Republic, January 20, 2012
Biggest defeat
0–4 vs. Brazil, September 27, 2007

Competitive record

FIFA Women's World Cup

The team has participated in every World Cup through 2019 and won a medal in each.

Olympic Games
The team has participated in every Olympic tournament through 2020 and reached the gold medal game in each until 2016, when they were eliminated in the quarterfinals on a penalty shootout loss to Sweden.

CONCACAF W Championship

 The U.S. team directly qualified for the 1999 FIFA Women's World Cup as hosts of the event. Because of this, they did not participate in the 1998 CONCACAF Championship, which was the qualification tournament for the World Cup.

Minor tournaments
SheBelieves Cup
The SheBelieves Cup is a global invitational tournament for national teams in women's soccer hosted in the United States.

Tournament of Nations
The Tournament of Nations was a global invitational tournament for national teams in women's soccer hosted in the United States in non-World Cup and non-Olympic years.

Algarve Cup
The Algarve Cup is a global invitational tournament for national teams in women's soccer hosted by the Portuguese Football Federation (FPF). Held annually in the Algarve region of Portugal since 1994, it has been one of the more prestigious women's soccer events other than the Women's World Cup and Olympic tournament, and it has been nicknamed the "Mini FIFA Women's World Cup." Since 2016, the SheBelieves Cup replaced it on the U.S. team's schedule.

HonorsWorld CupChampions: 1991, 1999, 2015, 2019
Runners-up: 2011
Third place: 1995, 2003, 2007Olympic GamesGold medalists: 1996, 2004, 2008, 2012
Silver medalists: 2000
Bronze medalists: 2020CONCACAF W ChampionshipChampions: 1991, 1993, 1994, 2000, 2002, 2006, 2014, 2018, 2022
Third place: 2010CONCACAF Women's Olympic Qualifying TournamentChampions: 2004, 2008, 2012, 2016, 2020Algarve CupChampions: 2000, 2003, 2004, 2005, 2007, 2008, 2010, 2011, 2013, 2015U.S. CupChampions: 1995, 1996, 1997, 1998, 1999, 2000, 2002Four Nations TournamentChampions: 1998, 2003, 2004, 2006, 2007, 2008, 2011Peace Queen Cup2008 Peace Queen Cup Rec.Sport.Soccer Statistics Foundation. Retrieved October 12, 2013.
Champions: 2006, 2008Albena CupChampions: 1991SheBelieves CupChampions: 2016, 2018, 2020, 2021, 2022, 2023Tournament of NationsChampions: 2018DFB Centenary TournamentChampions: 2000Pacific CupChampions: 2000Brazil CupChampions: 1996North America CupNorth America Cup 1990 Rec.Sport.Soccer Statistics Foundation. Retrieved October 12, 2013.
Champions: 1990Canada CupChampions: 1990Australia CupChampions: 2000Tournoi InternationalChampions: 1995Chiquita CupChampions: 1994Tri-Nations TournamentChampions: 1994Goodwill GamesChampions: 1998Columbus CupChampions: 1993

FIFA World Ranking

Last update was on June 25, 2021
Source:

 Best Ranking   Worst Ranking   Best Mover   Worst Mover'''  

See also

 Dare to Dream: The Story of the U.S. Women's Soccer Team'' – 2005 HBO documentary
 List of United States women's national soccer team hat-tricks
 U.S. Women's National Team Players Association
 U.S. women's national soccer team pay discrimination claim
 USWNT All-Time Best XI
 National Women's Soccer League (NWSL), 2013–present
 Soccer in the United States
 United States men's national soccer team

References

External links
 
 FIFA profile
Scorum

 
FIFA Women's World Cup-winning countries
North American women's national association football teams
United States Soccer Federation